An afro is a hairstyle.

Afro, Afros, or AFRO may also refer to:

Africa
 Afro-, relating to Africa
 Afro (currency), a possible name for the single currency of the proposed African Monetary Union
 AFRO, the African regional office of the World Health Organization
 ICFTU African Regional Organisation, a former regional union confederation

People
 Afro Basaldella, an Italian painter and a member of the Scuola Romana
 Afro, a suggested name for African-Americans

Art, entertainment, and media
 Afro (album), an album by trumpeter Dizzy Gillespie recorded in 1954
 Afro (genre), a genre of Cuban popular music
 "Afro" (1994), song by the Jon Spencer Blues Explosion
 AFRO, a North American television network from Afrotainment
 Baltimore Afro-American, a newspaper

Vessels
 , a cargo ship built in 1942, later named SS Afro

See also 
 Afro, a brand name of methyltestosterone